Jamie Oliver's Food Escapes is a 2011 television docu-series in which Chef Jamie Oliver travels across Europe and North Africa to find authentic ingredients and extraordinary characters. The series was released under the British title Jamie Does... in 2010 on Channel 4. Oliver stops in Venice, Athens,  the French Pyrenees, Andalusia, Stockholm and Marrakesh and uses local ingredients in each location to prepare recipes as well as meet various locals. He immerses himself in the cultures, learning traditional cooking practices from the locals and taking part in their cultural ceremonies.

Episodes

References

External links

Channel 4 link on Jamie Does
Jamie Does recipes

Channel 4 original programming
2011 British television series debuts
2011 British television series endings
Food travelogue television series